Rupert David Hannah (30 July 1900 – 19 July 1983) was an Australian rules footballer who played with Collingwood in the Victorian Football League (VFL).

Notes

External links 

Rupe Hannah's profile at Collingwood Forever

1900 births
1983 deaths
Australian rules footballers from Melbourne
Collingwood Football Club players
People from Carlton North, Victoria